This is a list of buildings which are examples of Gothic architecture, either their totality or portions thereof; examples of Gothic Revival architecture have been excluded. This list is separated into regions relating to the borders and dominant powers during the period of when these buildings were constructed (as opposed to modern ones), however, these are subdivided into nations according to modern borders.

Note: Buildings in bold have either been designated as UNESCO World Heritage Sites or are part of one.

British Isles

Republic of Ireland 

All of the following existing Gothic buildings are either national monuments or national architectural heritage.

United Kingdom

England 

All of the following existing Gothic buildings are either Grade I listed or scheduled monuments.

Northern Ireland 
All of the following Gothic buildings are Grade A listed, scheduled monuments, or state care monuments.

Scotland 
All of the following existing Gothic buildings are either Category A listed or scheduled monuments.

Wales 

All of the following Gothic buildings are Grade I listed or scheduled monuments.

Crown Dependencies 
Although not part of the UK and only partially part of the British Isles, the Crown Dependancies are under British rule, thus their inclusion here.

All of the following existing Gothic buildings are Manx heritage sites, Jersey listed buildings, or Guernsey protected monuments.

Central Europe

Austria 
All of the following existing Gothic buildings are Denkmalgeschützt Objekte.

Czechia 

All of the following existing Gothic buildings are cultural monuments of Czechia.

Germany 
All of the following existing Gothic buildings are Kulturdenkmaler.

Hungry 
All of the following existing Gothic buildings are either cultural heritage monuments of Hungary or world heritage sites.

Liechtenstein 
All of the following existing Gothic buildings are Kulturgüter Liechtenstein.

Romania 
All of the following existing Gothic buildings are monumente istorice.

Slovakia 
All of the following existing Gothic buildings are cultural heritage monuments of Slovakia.

Slovenia 
All of the following existing Gothic buildings are cultural monuments of Slovenia.

Switzerland 
All of the following existing Gothic buildings are either class A properties or world heritage sites.

Eastern Europe

Belarus 
All of the following existing Gothic buildings are ranked architectural heritage of Belarus.

Latvia 
All of the following existing Gothic buildings are national architectural monuments of Latvia.

Lithuania 
All of the following existing Gothic buildings are Nekilnojamųjų kultūros vertybių.

Poland

Russia 
Due to the recent arrival of the Russian language to the region known today as Kaliningrad and the consequently far greater degree of relevance of German to that region's history and architecture, when possible the German names have been used.

Ukraine

France

France 
All of the following existing Gothic buildings are monuments historiques classés.

United States of America

Iberian Peninsula

Portugal

Spain

Spanish Colonies

Italian Peninsula and Southeastern Europe

Croatia 
All of the following existing Gothic buildings are protected cultural properties of Croatia.

Cyprus

Greece

Italy

Other Nations 
Most of these countries have only a few surviving Gothic buildings, and in many cases the Gothic architectural style never took.

Low Lands

Belgium

Luxembourg

The Netherlands 
All of the following existing Gothic buildings are Rijksmonumenten.

Nordics

Estonia

Finland

Kingdom of Denmark

Denmark 
All of the following existing Gothic buildings are either listed buildings or protected monuments of Denmark.

Faroe Islands

Norway 
All of the following existing Gothic buildings are cultural heritage sites of Norway.

Sweden 
All of the following existing Gothic buildings are either listed buildings or otherwise registered buildings of Sweden.

See also 
 Gothicmed
 List of Brick Gothic buildings
 List of Gothic Revival buildings

References

Medieval architecture

Lists of buildings and structures by type